Davāzdah Imām, also known as The Shrine of the Twelve Imams, is an 11th-century mausoleum and ziyarat (shrine) in the Fahadan quarter of Yazd, Iran. It is the earliest-dated building in Yazd. It is adjacent to Zendan-e Eskandar (Alexander's Prison). The building is made of brick, and the inside bears inscriptions of the names of The Twelve Imams (who are not, despite its name, buried in the mausoleum).

References 

Ziyarat
Buildings and structures in Yazd